Nick Hallett (born February 12, 1994) is a professional Canadian football defensive back for the Winnipeg Blue Bombers of the Canadian Football League (CFL). He was drafted in the seventh round, 61st overall, in the 2019 CFL Draft by the Blue Bombers and was signed on May 15, 2019. He played U Sports football for the Toronto Varsity Blues.

References

External links
Winnipeg Blue Bombers bio 

1994 births
Living people
Canadian football defensive backs
Sportspeople from London, Ontario
Players of Canadian football from Ontario
Toronto Varsity Blues football players
Winnipeg Blue Bombers players